A cloven paw is a congenital anomaly (birth defect) that affects some animals such as dogs. The condition occurs when the animal's paws do not separate properly during development.

Cloven paw (conjoined paw pad) in dogs
Though more common in the front paws, any of the paws can be affected and whilst usually cause the animal no discomfort, there have been cases where the condition has caused issues but is easily resolved with a small operation to separate the pads.

Paw development
During the third stage of development (weeks 5-6) in the mother dog's womb, the foetus starts to rapidly grow and features like the feet and nails are developed, if here is any defect within the development at this stage, it can cause the toes to only partially separate resulting in the "cloven" look.

References

External links
 YouTube
 Daily dog drama - Conjoined Paw Pads Dogs.
 Gundog Training Forum - Conjoined paw Pads
 Just Answer - The two centre toe pads on BOTH of our puppy's front feet are fused/connected.
 Wag walking - How-do-dog-fetuses-form
 YouTube - Animals In The Womb | Developing Dogs | Channel 4

Animal anatomy